In telecommunication, the term ringaround has the following meanings:

The improper routing of a call back through a switching center already engaged in attempting to complete the same call.
In secondary surveillance radar, the presence of false targets declared as a result of transponder interrogation by side lobes of the interrogating antenna.

References

Telecommunications engineering